John Inyang Okoro  (born 7 July 1959) is a Nigerian jurist and Justice of the Supreme Court of Nigeria. His appointment as justice of the Supreme Court of Nigeria was confirmed by the Senate in October 2013. He was sworn in on 15 November 2014 by Justice Aloma Mariam Mukhtar, the former Chief Justice of Nigeria. He was arrested by the department of state security services (DSS), on 8 October 2016 on allegations of bribery and corruption. After investigations he was exonerated and recalled as a judge of the Supreme Court. He was later cleared by the DSS in December 2019 and never faced trial for the crimes he was charged with.

References

Nigerian jurists
Living people
1959 births
People from Akwa Ibom State
Supreme Court of Nigeria justices